Love Bug is a 2010 Philippine television drama romance anthology broadcast by GMA Network. It premiered on May 23, 2010 replacing Dear Friend. The show concluded on September 19, 2010 with a total of 16 episodes. It was replaced by Reel Love Presents Tween Hearts in its timeslot.

Synopsis
With the success of weekly drama anthologies, television series, and drama series, and reality sitcoms GMA Network provides a Sunday afternoon anthology tackling love stories. It was shortly-lived, airing from May 23, 2010 to September 19, 2010. It is now renamed Reel-Love Presents.

Chapters

"The Last Romance"
A young athlete, Rackie Carla Abellana, meets Hero Dennis Trillo, a handsome young man. They fall in love aboard a cruise going to Hong Kong. Rackie has a terminal illness; Hero is a soon-to-be-wed groom and event organizer working his way to give his soon-to-be wife Iwa Moto the perfect life. Rackie and Hero's encounter makes them realize that love only comes once in a lifetime in all unexpected places.

"The Last Romance" aired for four episodes.

"Exchange of Hearts"
This is the first time for the new StarStruck V competitors to enter a TV series. The production focuses on finalists in the next story about the tests and complicated world of love between young adults.

It starred Diva Montelaba, Sarah Lahbati, Steven Silva, and Enzo Pineda.

"Wish Come True"
The third episode starred Rich Asuncion, Chariz Solomon, Daniel Matsunaga and Kris Bernal.

"Say I Do"
Alvin (Mark Anthony Fernandez) is madly in love with Faye (Lovi Poe). Feeling they are meant to be together, they decide to get married. Alvin wants his divorced parents to come together at the wedding. Chona (Carmi Martin) makes a scene and Ulyeses (Joey Marquez) decides to apologize for the dismay and commotion at the important event. Alvin just wants them to get along (but not be together) after his mother's heartache and hardships. Alvin and Faye go to the same phase as well as they start fighting. Will they realize that sometimes people who are meant to be together should be with the ones they love? Is love better the second time around?

The fourth episode aired August 29, 2010 to September 19, 2010.

Ratings
According to AGB Nielsen Philippines' Mega Manila household television ratings, the pilot episode of Love Bug earned a 9.9% rating. While the final episode scored a 2.7% rating in Mega Manila People/Individual television ratings.

Accolades

References

External links
 

2010 Philippine television series debuts
2010 Philippine television series endings
Filipino-language television shows
GMA Network original programming
Philippine anthology television series
Philippine romantic comedy television series
Television shows set in the Philippines